John W. Glenn (January 1850 – November 10, 1888) was an American Major League Baseball player for four teams during his seven-year career.

On November 10, 1888, Glenn died from injuries sustained from being accidentally shot the week prior by a police officer in Sandy Hill, New York. Glenn was accused of robbery and rape of a 12-year-old girl, and the officer was attempting to protect him from a lynch mob.

References

Bibliography

External links

19th-century baseball players
1850 births
1888 deaths
Major League Baseball left fielders
Major League Baseball first basemen
Washington Nationals (NABBP) players
Washington Olympics (NABBP) players
Washington Olympics players
Washington Nationals (NA) players
Washington Blue Legs players
Chicago White Stockings players
Accidental deaths in New York (state)
Deaths by firearm in New York (state)
Firearm accident victims in the United States
Sportspeople from Rochester, New York
Baseball players from New York (state)
Rochester (minor league baseball) players
Washington Nationals (minor league) players
People from Hudson Falls, New York
People shot dead by law enforcement officers in the United States
People charged with robbery
People charged with rape